36 Aurigae is a single variable star located about 910 light years away from the Sun in the constellation Auriga. It has the variable star designation V444 Aurigae, while 36 Aurigae is the Flamsteed designation. This object is visible to the naked eye as a dim, white-hued star with a baseline apparent visual magnitude of 5.71. It is moving further from the Earth with a heliocentric radial velocity of +16 km/s.

It is an Alpha2 Canum Venaticorum variable that ranges in visual magnitude from 5.70 down to 5.74 with a period of 14.368 days. The star has 4.4 times the mass of the Sun and is radiating 724 times the Sun's luminosity from its photosphere at an effective temperature of 10,046 K.

References

External links
 HR 2101
 Image 36 Aurigae

A-type main-sequence stars
B-type main-sequence stars
Alpha2 Canum Venaticorum variables
Ap stars
Auriga (constellation)
J06005856+4754069
BD+47 1227
Aurigae, 36
040394
028499
2101
Aurigae, V444